Calvin Plummer (born 14 February 1963) is an English former professional footballer born in Nottingham who played as a winger in the Football League for Nottingham Forest, Chesterfield, Derby County, Barnsley and Plymouth Argyle. He also played on loan for Derry City in the League of Ireland playing in the 1988 FAI Cup Final and for Lahden Reipas in Finland, and for English non-league clubs Gainsborough Trinity, Shepshed Albion, Corby Town, Nuneaton Borough, Birstall United, Grantham Town, Arnold Town, Shepshed Dynamo and Kirby Muxloe. He was manager of Bilborough and joint manager of Arnold Town, before taking becoming assistant manager at Gedling Miners Welfare.

Plummer also caused controversy in 1982, when he agreed to play on an unofficial tour of South Africa. The tour, organised by Jimmy Hill and sponsored by South African Breweries, was largely made up of players heading towards the end of their careers. Plummer's presence as the only younger player, as well as the only black player in the initial squad, gave rise to accusations of tokenism. The tour itself was both a footballing and public relations disaster and caused great damage to Plummer's career. Brian Clough, his Nottingham Forest manager at the time, was publicly critical of Plummer's naivety and relations did sour between them. Despite this, Clough re-signed Plummer later in his career.

References

1963 births
Living people
English footballers
Association football wingers
Nottingham Forest F.C. players
Chesterfield F.C. players
Derby County F.C. players
Barnsley F.C. players
Plymouth Argyle F.C. players
Derry City F.C. players
League of Ireland players
FC Lahti players
Gainsborough Trinity F.C. players
Corby Town F.C. players
Nuneaton Borough F.C. players
Birstall United F.C. players
Grantham Town F.C. players
Arnold Town F.C. players
Shepshed Dynamo F.C. players
Kirby Muxloe F.C. players
English Football League players
English football managers
Arnold Town F.C. managers